Pithrawas is a village in Khol Block of Rewari, Rewari district, Haryana, India, in Gurgaon division. Its postal head office is at Khori.

Adjacent villages
Sundroj
Dhamlawas
Gumina
Bhandor
Shahbajpura Istmurar
Makharia
Tint
Harjipur
Bohatwas Ahir
Bawana Gujar
Mailawas
Khori
Pali

References

Villages in Rewari district